Cecil Louis Troughton Smith (27 August 1899 – 2 April 1966), known by his pen name Cecil Scott "C. S." Forester, was an English novelist known for writing tales of naval warfare, such as the 12-book Horatio Hornblower series depicting a Royal Navy officer during the Napoleonic wars. The Hornblower novels A Ship of the Line and Flying Colours were jointly awarded the James Tait Black Memorial Prize for fiction in 1938.  His other works include The African Queen (1935; turned into a 1951 film by John Huston) and The Good Shepherd (1955; turned into a 2020 film, Greyhound, adapted by and starring Tom Hanks).

Early years
Forester was born in Cairo.  After the family broke up when he was still at an early age his mother took him with her to London, where he was educated at Alleyn's School and Dulwich College. He began to study medicine at Guy's Hospital, but left without completing his degree. He was of good height and somewhat athletic, but wore glasses and had a slender physique, so he failed his Army physical and was told that there was no chance that he would be accepted. He began writing seriously, using his pen name, in around 1921.

Second World War
During the Second World War Forester moved to the United States, where he worked for the British Ministry of Information and wrote propaganda to encourage the U.S. to join the Allies. He eventually settled in Berkeley, California. 

In 1942, while he was living in Washington, D.C., he met Roald Dahl and encouraged him to write about his experiences in the RAF. According to Dahl's autobiography,  Lucky Break, Forester asked him about his experiences as a fighter pilot, and this prompted Dahl to write his first story, "A Piece of Cake".

Literary career

Forester wrote many novels, but he is best known for the 12-book Horatio Hornblower series about an officer in the Royal Navy during the Napoleonic Wars. He began the series with Hornblower fairly high in rank in the first novel, which was published in 1937, but demand for more stories led him to fill in Hornblower's life story, and he wrote novels detailing his rise from the rank of midshipman. The last completed novel was published in 1962. Hornblower's fictional adventures were based on real events, but Forester wrote the body of the works carefully to avoid entanglements with real world history, so that Hornblower is always off on another mission when a great naval battle occurs during the Napoleonic Wars.

Forester's other novels include The African Queen (1935) and The General (1936); two novels about the Peninsular War, Death to the French (published in the United States as Rifleman Dodd) and The Gun (filmed as The Pride and the Passion in 1957); and seafaring stories that do not involve Hornblower, such as Brown on Resolution (1929), The Captain from Connecticut (1941), The Ship (1943), and Hunting the Bismarck (1959), which was used as the basis of the screenplay for the film Sink the Bismarck! (1960). Several of his novels have been filmed, including The African Queen (1951), directed by John Huston. Forester is also credited as story writer on several films not based on his published novels, including Commandos Strike at Dawn (1942).

Forester also wrote several volumes of short stories set during the Second World War. Those in The Nightmare (1954) were based on events in Nazi Germany, ending at the Nuremberg trials. The stories in The Man in the Yellow Raft (1969) follow the career of the destroyer USS Boon, while many of the stories in Gold from Crete (1971) follow the destroyer HMS Apache. The last of the stories in Gold from Crete is If Hitler Had Invaded England, which offers an imagined sequence of events starting with Hitler's attempt to implement Operation Sea Lion and culminating in the early military defeat of Nazi Germany in the summer of 1941. 

His non-fiction works about seafaring include The Age of Fighting Sail (1956), an account of the sea battles between Great Britain and the United States in the War of 1812.

Forester also published the crime novels Payment Deferred (1926) and Plain Murder (1930), as well as two children's books. Poo-Poo and the Dragons (1942) was created as a series of stories told to his son George to encourage him to finish his meals. George had mild food allergies and needed encouragement to eat. The Barbary Pirates (1953) is a children's history of early 19th-century pirates.

Forester appeared as a contestant on the television quiz programme You Bet Your Life, hosted by Groucho Marx, in an episode broadcast on 1 November 1956. 

A previously unknown novel of Forester's, The Pursued, was discovered in 2003 and published by Penguin Classics on 3 November 2011.

Personal life 
Forester married Kathleen Belcher in 1926. They had two sons, John, born in 1929, and George, born in 1933. The couple divorced in 1945. In 1947 he married Dorothy Foster.

Forester died in Fullerton, California on 2 April 1966. 

John Forester wrote a two-volume biography of his father, including many elements of Forester's life which became clear to his son only after his father's death.

Bibliography

Horatio Hornblower
 1950 Mr Midshipman Hornblower. Michael Joseph.
 1941 "The Hand of Destiny".Collier's
 1950 "Hornblower and the Widow McCool" ("Hornblower’s Temptation" ""Hornblower and the Big Decision"). The Saturday Evening Post
 1952 Lieutenant Hornblower. Michael Joseph.
 1962 Hornblower and the Hotspur. Michael Joseph.
 1967 Hornblower and the Crisis, an unfinished novel. Michael Joseph. Published in the US as Hornblower During the Crisis (posthumous)
 1953 Hornblower and the Atropos. Michael Joseph.
 1937 The Happy Return. Michael Joseph. Published in the US as Beat to Quarters
 1938 A Ship of the Line. Michael Joseph.
 1941 "Hornblower's Charitable Offering". Argosy
 1938  Flying Colours. Michael Joseph.
 1941 "Hornblower and His Majesty". Collier's
 1945 The Commodore. Michael Joseph. Published in the US as Commodore Hornblower
 1946 Lord Hornblower. Michael Joseph.
 1958 Hornblower in the West Indies. Michael Joseph. Published in the US as Admiral Hornblower in the West Indies
 1967 "The Last Encounter". Sunday Mirror, 8 May 1966 (posthumous).
 1964 The Hornblower Companion. Michael Joseph. (Supplementary book comprising another short story, "The Point and the Edge" only as an outline, "The Hornblower Atlas" and "Some Personal Notes")

Omnibus
 1964 The Young Hornblower. (a compilation of books 1, 2 & 3). Michael Joseph.
 1965 Captain Hornblower (a compilation of books 5, 6 & 7). Michael Joseph.
 1968 Admiral Hornblower (a compilation of books 8, 9, 10 & 11). Michael Joseph.
 2011 Hornblower Addendum – Five Short Stories (originally published in magazines)

Other novels
 1924 A Pawn among Kings. Methuen.
 1924 The Paid Piper. Methuen.
 1926 Payment Deferred. Methuen.
 1927 Love Lies Dreaming. John Lane.
 1927 The Wonderful Week. John Lane.
 1928 The Daughter of the Hawk. John Lane.
 1929 Brown on Resolution. John Lane.
 1930 Plain Murder. John Lane.
 1931 Two-and-Twenty. John Lane.
 1932 Death to the French. John Lane. Published in the U.S. as Rifleman Dodd. Little Brown.
 1933 The Gun. John Lane.
 1934 The Peacemaker. Heinemann.
 1935 The African Queen. Heinemann.
 1935 The Pursued (a lost novel rediscovered in 1999 and published by Penguin Classics in 2011)
 1936 The General. Michael Joseph. First published as a serial in the News Chronicle 14–18 January 1935
 1940 The Earthly Paradise. Michael Joseph. Published in the U.S. as To the Indies.
 1941 The Captain from Connecticut. Michael Joseph.
 1942 Poo-Poo and the Dragons. Michael Joseph.
 1943 The Ship. Michael Joseph.
 1948 The Sky and the Forest. Michael Joseph.
 1951 Randall and the River of Time. Michael Joseph.
 1955 The Good Shepherd. Michael Joseph.

Short stories
"The Wandering Gentile", Liverpool Echo, 1955

Posthumous
 1967  Long before Forty (autobiographical). Michael Joseph.
 1971  Gold from Crete (short stories). Michael Joseph.
 2011  The Pursued (novel). Penguin.

Collections
 1944 The Bedchamber Mystery; to which is added the story of The Eleven Deckchairs and Modernity and Maternity. S. J. Reginald Saunders. Published in the US as Three Matronly Mysteries. eNet Press
 1954  The Nightmare. Michael Joseph
 1969  The Man in the Yellow Raft. Michael Joseph (posthumous)

Plays in three acts; John Lane
 1931  U 97
 1933  Nurse Cavell. (with C. E. Bechhofer Roberts)

Non-fiction
 1922 Victor Emmanuel II. Methuen (?)
 1927 Victor Emmanuel II and the Union of Italy. Methuen.
 1924 Napoleon and his Court. Methuen.
 1925 Josephine, Napoleon’s Empress. Methuen.
 1928 Louis XIV, King of France and Navarre. Methuen.
 1929 Lord Nelson. John Lane.
 1929 The Voyage of the Annie Marble. John Lane.
 1930 The Annie Marble in Germany. John Lane.
 1936 Marionettes at Home. Michael Joseph Ltd.
 1953 The Adventures of John Wetherell. Doubleday & Company, Inc.
 1953 The Barbary Pirates. Landmark Books, Random House. Published in the UK in 1956 by Macdonald & Co.
 1957 The Naval War of 1812. Michael Joseph. Published in the US as The Age of Fighting Sail
 1959 Hunting the Bismarck. Michael Joseph. Published in the US as The Last Nine Days of the Bismark and Sink the Bismarck

Non-fiction short pieces
"Calmness under Air Raids in Franco Territory". Western Mail, 28 April 1937
"Who Is Financing Franco?". Aberdeen Press & Journal, 5 May 1937
”Sabotage”. Sunday Graphic, 11 September 1938
"Saga of the Submarines". Falkirk Herald, 1 August 1945
"Hollywood Coincidence". Leicester Chronicle, 3 September 1955

Film adaptations 
In addition to providing the source material for numerous adaptations (not all of which are listed below), Forester was also credited as "adapted for the screen by" for Captain Horatio Hornblower.

 Payment Deferred (1932), based on a 1931 play which was in turn based on Forester's novel of the same name
 Brown on Resolution (1935), based on the novel of the same name
 Eagle Squadron (1942), story
 Commandos Strike at Dawn (1942), short story "The Commandos"
 Forever and a Day (1943), story
 Captain Horatio Hornblower (1951), based on the novels The Happy Return, A Ship of the Line and Flying Colours
 The African Queen (1951), the novel of the same name
 Sailor of the King (1953), the novel Brown on Resolution
 The Pride and the Passion (1957), the novel The Gun
 Sink the Bismarck! (1960), the novel The Last Nine Days of the Bismarck
 Hornblower (1998–2003 series of made-for-television movies), based on the novels Mr. Midshipman Hornblower, Lieutenant Hornblower and Hornblower and the Hotspur
 Greyhound (2020), the novel The Good Shepherd

See also 
 Honor Harrington – a fictional space captain and admiral in the Honorverse novels by David Weber, inspired by Horatio Hornblower (see dedication in On Basilisk Station)
 Patrick O'Brian – author of the Aubrey–Maturin series
 Dudley Pope – author of the Ramage series
 Richard Woodman - author of the Nathaniel Drinkwater series
 Douglas Reeman (writing as Alexander Kent) - The Bolitho novels

References

Further reading
 Sternlicht, Sanford V., C.S. Forester and the Hornblower saga (Syracuse University Press, 1999)
 Van der Kiste, John, C.S. Forester's Crime Noir: A view of the murder stories (KDP, 2018)

External links 

 C. S. Forester Collection at the Harry Ransom Center
 
 
 C. S. Forester Society, which publishes the e-journal Reflections
 
 
 C. S. Forester on You Bet Your Life in 1956

1899 births
1966 deaths
20th-century English novelists
20th-century English male writers
20th-century pseudonymous writers
Alumni of King's College London
English historical novelists
English male novelists
James Tait Black Memorial Prize recipients
Nautical historical novelists
People educated at Alleyn's School
People educated at Dulwich College
Writers about the Age of Sail
Writers from London
Writers of historical fiction set in the modern age